Carlo Piana is a lawyer by training and a free software advocate. A qualified attorney in Italy, Piana has been practicing IT law since 1995, focusing his practice on software, technology, standardization, data protection and digital liberties in general, and served as external general counsel to the Free Software Foundation Europe ("FSFE").

Piana has been involved in some of the cornerstone legal cases in Europe, such as the long-running antitrust battle between the EU Commission and Microsoft, where he represents both the FSFE and the Samba Team, the standardization of OOXML at ISO/IEC, and more recently defending Oracle in its attempted acquisition of Sun Microsystems.

Piana is a member of the Editorial Committee of the International Free and Open Source Software Law Review ("IFOSS L. rev.") and has been a member of the board of the Open Source Initiative since 2022.

In 2008 he established a freelance consulting practice on IT law, where he leads a small group of IT lawyers named Array.

References

External links

 Array is an array Array official website
  Interview by Groklaw
 Law is Freedom Blog, both in Italian and in English
 Profile on Fossbazaar
 IFOSS L. rev. Editorial Committee
 Interview by Roberto Galoppini (Commercial Open Source Software)
 Recommended lawyer by the FSFE's Freedom Task Force
 Interview by Linux World

Living people
20th-century Italian lawyers
1968 births
21st-century Italian lawyers